Chest surgery may refer to:

Thoracic surgery
Breast surgery